Eric Kabera (born in 1970) is a Rwandan journalist and filmmaker and founder and president of Rwanda Cinema Center.

Early life and career
Eric Kabera, a Rwandan, was born in Zaire, now the Democratic Republic of the Congo (DRC). Even though he was still living in the DRC when the Rwandan genocide against the Tutsi started in April 1994, Kabera said that his family members who were living in Rwanda at the time,  32 of them dying in the violence. This inspired him to make a 2001 feature film about the genocide titled 100 Days and a 2004 documentary titled Keepers of Memory, in which he interviewed both victims and perpetrators of the atrocities. 

100 Days, which Kabera made in collaboration with the British filmmaker Nick Hughes, was the first film shot in Rwanda after the Rwanda genocide against the Tutsi in 1994, and it was also the first feature film about the genocide before Hotel Rwanda. The film employed no professional actors, rather the filmmakers used actual Tutsi and Hutu survivors to act out the script, and was shot on location at the actual scenes where acts of genocide occurred. Cast members were: Eric Bridges Twahirwa, Cleophas Kabasita, Davis Kagenza, Mazimpaka Kennedy, Davis Kwizera, David Mulwa, Didier Ndengeyintwali, Denis Nsanzamahoro, and Justin Rusandazangabo.

Later activities 
Kabera is the founder and president of the Rwanda Cinema Center, an organization that aims to promote the Rwanda's film industry. Kabera initially set up the Center as an organization that would train new filmmakers but, since 2005, the center has been better known for organizing the annual Rwanda Film Festival. The Rwanda Film Festival, nicknamed "Hillywood" due to Rwanda's nickname of "Land of a Thousand Hills", is a travelling festival. Due to Kabera's desire to show the films to as large an audience as possible, the festival is held not only in the capital of Kigali but the films, especially ones made by Rwandan filmmakers, are also shown on large inflatable screens in rural areas throughout the country. More recently, Kabera has stated that the festival will make a move away from focusing only on the issue of the genocide; rather "other social issues" of modern Rwanda will be explored.<ref  Kabera says that he would like to make a comedy.

Partly to help further promote the film festival, Kabera has started a project to build Rwanda's first purpose-built movie theatre in Kigali. The  theatre has been under construction since at least 2007 but progress is slow due to lack of funds necessary to complete the project.

Filmography

References

External links
 
 Official website
 Interview with Kabera on Behind the Roadblock for Radio France Internationale

1970 births
Living people
Rwandan film directors
Rwandan film producers
Tutsi people